Following is a list of teams on the 2019–20 World Curling Tour, which was part of the 2019–20 curling season. Only the skips of the teams are listed. For mixed doubles teams, both members of the team are listed.

Men
As of August 22, 2019

Women
As of March 15, 2020

Mixed doubles
As of October 7, 2019

References 

Teams
2019 in curling
World Curling Tour teams